James or Jim Meyer may refer to:
James H. Meyer (born 1943), member of the Illinois House of Representatives, 1993–2009
James Henry Meyer (1922–2002), chancellor of the University of California, Davis, 1969–1987
James Meyer (footballer) (born 1986), Australian soccer player
James Meyer (cricketer) (born 1966), English cricketer
Jim Meyer (born 1963), offensive tackle for the Green Bay Packers, 1987

See also
Meyer (surname)
James Mayer (disambiguation)
James Myer (born 1951), American filmmaker